The Faculty of Engineering and Technology, Jamia Millia Islamia (JMIFET)  was established in 1985 in New Delhi, India to provide engineering education. All courses of the faculty are approved by the All India Council for Technical Education. JMI FET is one of the top ranked engineering colleges in the country.

History 

The BE course in civil engineering was started in 1979. The Faculty Of Engineering and Technology officially came into being in 1985. Undergraduate programmes in civil, electrical and mechanical engineering began is as old as the institution. Undergraduate programmes in electronics engineering began in 1996 and in computer engineering began in 2000. The building was inaugurated in October 1995. The four-storey structure has pointed arches adorning the windows. The entrance itself is pyramid-shaped.

Campus 
The faculty is located at Jamia Nagar, Okhla. The University cricket ground (Bhopal Ground) is the best by university standards in the country and has played host to many Ranji trophy cricket matches apart from hosting many matches including the semi-finals and the finals of the recently concluded university cricket championships. The Sports Complex also has tennis, basketball, volleyball, football and rugby courts (it was the official practice venue for rugby in the Commonwealth Games 2010) besides indoor facilities for table tennis and badminton apart from a synthetic athletics track. The complex also has a generously equipped gymnasium.

Admissions 
Admissions to the Bachelor of Technology Programme are based on the performance in the JEE Main examination conducted by the National Testing Agency.

Admissions towards the M.Tech. programme is based on the performance in GATE examination.

Departments and academic programmes 

The Faculty Of Engineering and Technology has the following departments

University Polytechnic 

Started in 1957 as the Civil and Rural Institute, now named as Jamia Polytechnic it is one of the oldest departments of Jamia Millia Islamia operative under the Faculty of Engineering and Technology of the university. It is conducting Diploma Engineering courses of three years duration in the following branches: 
  Diploma in Civil Engineering
  Diploma in Computer Engineering
  Diploma in Electrical Engineering
  Diploma in Electronics Engineering
  Diploma in Mechanical Engineering

Department of Applied Sciences & Humanities 
Established in 1996, as one among the departments of the Faculty of Engineering and Technology, this department participates in B.Tech. and M.Tech. programs offered by the Faculty. This department offers M.Tech. in the trending and diverse field of Engineering and Technology, M.Tech. Energy Science and M.Tech. Computational Mathematics. In addition, the department offers a two-year M.Sc. Electronic program with an intake of 30 students per year. The M.Sc. Electronics program imparts instruction in the basics of electronics science, The program has earned a prestigious position for itself among similar programs available in the country.

Department of Computer Engineering 
The Department of Computer Engineering was started in the year 2000. Two undergraduate courses are running in this department, which are B.Tech. in computer engineering and B.E. in computer engineering. The department also runs a Ph.D. program, under which a number of research scholars are working in the fields of networking, data mining, and artificial intelligence, among others.

Department of Civil Engineering 

The Department of Civil Engineering is one of the oldest and the largest department in the Faculty of Engineering & Technology. The department offers two undergraduate courses in civil engineering. The department also offers Master's programme with specializations in environmental engineering and earthquake engineering. More than 35 Ph.D. research scholars including many from foreign countries are currently working in the department on emerging research areas.

Department of Electrical Engineering 
The Department of Electrical Engineering began in 1985. The department offers a regular four-year B.Tech. program in "Electrical Engineering" and two regular M.Tech. Programs. The First M.Tech. Programme in "Electrical Power System Management (EPSM)" was started in 2003–2004. The second M.Tech. Programme in "Control and Instrumentation System (CIS)" is started in 2012. The department also runs a four-year B. E. (evening) program in "Electrical Engineering" for working professionals with Diploma. The department also operates Ph.D. programme in five major areas; (1) Power System, (2) Power Electronics and Drives, (3) Computer Technology, (4) Control and Instrumentation, and (5) Electronics and Communication.

Department of Electronics & Communication Engineering 
The department of Electronics and Communication Engineering came into existence at the Faculty of Engineering and Technology in 1996. The department runs two undergraduate courses - B.Tech. in Electronics and Communication Engineering and B.E (evening) program in Electronics and Communication Engineering. A proposal to start the M.Tech. Course has also been submitted and the course may be started at the earliest.

Department of Mechanical Engineering 
The department offers eight-semester Bachelor of Technology (B.Tech.) course with an annual intake of seventy, four-semester Master of Technology (M.Tech.) course with annual intake of 18 and Doctor of Philosophy (Ph.D.) in Mechanical Engineering. M.Tech. Program is offered in three broad areas of Mechanical Engineering namely Production-Industrial Engineering, Machine Design and Thermal Engineering. The department has a student population of about 560 at UG, 40 at PG and about 44 at doctoral research levels. It also offers a four-year Bachelor of Engineering (B.E) (Regular-Evening) program in the evening with an annual intake of 70 for working diploma holders to up-grade their knowledge and skill.

Department of Environmental Science

Aeronautics Degree

Rankings 

Faculty was ranked 26 among engineering colleges by the National Institutional Ranking Framework (NIRF) in 2022. The London-based Times Higher Educationsubject ranking-2020, Faculty of Engineering JMI scaled high in Engineering and Technology improving its position to 401-500 worldwide within India its rank is 11 among all higher education institutions while among universities it is 2nd position. JMI made to list of top institutions worldwide for computer science having been placed at 301–400, while among Indian Institutions it has been ranked at 16th position and at 7th among Indian universities.

Student activities

Festivals 
Xtacy is the Techno-Cultural Festival organised by CSI, IEEE, SAE, ASCE hosted by FET every year.

IEEE Student Branch of JMI organizes ENCOMIUM, their annual techno-cultural festival each year. So far there have been 10 editions of ENCOMIUM.

Algorhythm is the Techno-Cultural Festival organized by Computer Society of India, Jamia Millia Islamia Student Branch CSI-JMI and Department of Computer Engineering, Jamia Millia Islamia.

Tangelo Town is the Techno-Cultural cum sports festival hosted by the Faculty of Engineering and Technology.

Student organisations 

Student chapters of prominent technical societies like Computer Society of India, IEEE, Indian Society for Technical Education (ISTE), American Society of Mechanical Engineers (ASME), Society of Automotive Engineers (SAE), American Society of Civil Engineers (ASCE), Robot Society of India (TRS) are there in the faculty. Apart from Technical organisations the college also has cultural and other non-technical clubs including the likes of Literary Club, Drama Club, Debating Club, Entrepreneurship Club, Enactus Club, Social Services Club, Music Club etc.

Notable alumni 
Sanjeev Aggarwal, Founder of energy company Amplus Energy Solution

References 

Engineering colleges in Delhi
Jamia Millia Islamia